The Midnight Special was the name of a passenger train formerly operated by the Chicago and Alton Railroad and its successor, the Gulf, Mobile and Ohio Railroad.  The train departed Union Station in St. Louis, Missouri, at 11:30 p.m. nightly and arrived at Union Station in Chicago, Illinois, at 7 a.m. the following day. In the heyday of overnight travel, from 1920 through the end of World War II, the Midnight Specials were all Pullman Co. trains carrying no coaches and as many as 12 sleeping cars.

On December 29/30, 1968, the Midnight Special carried 19 passengers on the last Pullman sleeping car trip between Chicago, Illinois, and St. Louis, Missouri. Operations of the Pullman Company sleeper cars ceased and all leases were terminated on December 31, 1968. On January 1, 1969, the Pullman Company was dissolved and all assets were liquidated. (The most visible result on many railroads, including Union Pacific, was that the Pullman name was removed from the letterboard of all Pullman-owned cars.) An auction of all Pullman remaining assets was held at the Pullman plant in Chicago in early 1970. The Pullman, Inc., company remained in place until 1981 or 1982 to close out all remaining liabilities and claims, operating from an office in Denver. The Midnight Special made its final run on April 30, 1971, although Amtrak continued several other passenger trains over the same route traversed by the Midnight Special.

This Midnight Special is not the same train as in the famous Lead Belly song "Midnight Special". Although later versions place the locale of the song near Houston, early versions such as "Walk Right In Belmont" (Wilmer Watts; Frank Wilson, 1927) and "North Carolina Blues" (Roy Martin, 1930) — both essentially the same song as "Midnight Special" — place it in North Carolina. Most of the early versions, however, have no particular location. Only one recording, collected by the Lomaxes at the Mississippi State Penitentiary, actually identifies the railroad operating the Midnight Special — the Illinois Central which had a route through Mississippi.  More likely the song refers to the Missouri Pacific's Houston to New Orleans train called the Houstonian which departed Houston's Union Station shortly before midnight.

References

Named passenger trains of the United States
Passenger trains of the Alton Railroad
Passenger trains of the Gulf, Mobile and Ohio Railroad
Night trains of the United States